Dreamland Express is the 18th studio album by American singer-songwriter John Denver released in June 1985. The singles from this album were "Dreamland Express" and "Don't Close Your Eyes, Tonight".

Track listing

Side One
 "Dreamland Express" (Denver)
 "Claudette" (Roy Orbison)
 "Gimme Your Love" (Jack Conrad, Frank Musker)
 "Got My Heart Set on You" (Dobie Gray, Bud Reneau)
 "If Ever" (Stephanie Andrews, Stevie Wonder)

Side Two
 "The Harder They Fall" (Denver)
 "Don't Close Your Eyes, Tonight" (Richard Kerr, Frank Musker)
 "A Wild Heart Looking For Home" (Denver, Joe Henry)
 "I'm In The Mood To Be Desired" (Andre Martel, Katrina Walker)
 "Trail of Tears" (Roger Cook, Allen Reynolds, Randy Handley)
 "African Sunrise" (Denver)

Personnel
John Denver – vocals, guitar
Paulinho da Costa – percussion
Pete Christlieb – saxophone
Conrad Reeder – background vocals
Robbie Buchanan – synthesizer
Roger Nichols – percussion
Dean Parks – guitar
Jerry Scheff – bass
Jerry Carrigan – drums
Chuck Findley – trumpet
Sid Sharp – concert master
Glen D. Hardin – piano, synthesizer
Gene Morford – background vocals
Marty Walsh – guitar
Stevie Wonder – harmonica on "If Ever"
Jim Haas – background vocals
Elizabeth Lamers – background vocals
Jim Horn – saxophone
Joe Turano – background vocals
Billy Zoom – guitar feedback
James Burton – guitar

Chart performance

References

John Denver albums
1985 albums
RCA Records albums
Albums produced by Roger Nichols (recording engineer)